Trash: Short Stories is a short story collection by Dorothy Allison, was first published in 1988 by Firebrand Books, later by Penguin (1990) and Plume (2002). It won the 1989 Lambda Literary Award for "Best Lesbian Small Press Book" and the Lambda Literary Award "Best Lesbian Fiction".

Contents
 River of Names
 Meanest Woman Ever Left Tennessee
 Mama
 Gospel Song
 I'm Working On My Charm
 Steal Away
 Monkeybites
 Don't Tell Me You Don't Know
 Demon Lover
 Her Thighs
 Muscles of the Mind
 Violence Against Women Begins at Home
 A Lesbian Appetite
 Lupus

Re-release
The re-release by Plume in 2002 contained a new short-story:
 Compassion
The 2002 re-release also included Deciding to Live: Preface to the First Edition, which details the transformation Allison goes through after a fight she has had with her lover, and her mother's reaction to her. It showcases Allison's beginning as a writer, a time when she wrote as a way to escape the monotony of her job as a low-level government clerk. Detailing the reasons for which she has decided to live, Allison reveals the underlying truth behind her stories and the reasons for which she writes fiction.

Themes
Allison's short stories address themes such as: strength, cycles of poverty, identity, aggression, mother/daughter relationships, survival.

Survival:
Allison's short story "Mama" showcases the correlation between abuse and poverty and what one must to do keep alive. Jack, the step-father, abuses the narrator and her mother. This abuse stems from the stress of Jack's unemployment. The lack of a steady pay labels the family as a lower economic household. The narrator's mother wants to leave Jack. We find this out in the short story "Don't Tell Me You Don't Know". The narrator quotes, "Some people get raped at eleven by a stepfather their mama half hates but can't afford to leave" (Allison, 105). This quote and different abuse instincts throughout "Mama" show us how the narrator's mother had to choose between an abusive household or homelessness. Both outcomes are undesirable. The mother used her survival instincts to choose the one that would keep her family alive.

American short story collections
1988 short story collections
1980s LGBT literature
Lambda Literary Award-winning works
Lesbian working-class culture
LGBT short story collections
Working-class culture in the United States
Working-class literature
Works about classism